Cyperus concinnus (common name - trim flat-sedge) is a sedge of the family Cyperaceae that is native to Australia, and found in New South Wales, Queensland, the Northern Territory, South Australia, Victoria and Western Australia.

Description
It has culms with a triangular cross section.

Distribution
It is found in all the mainland states and territories of Australia except for South Australia. In Western Australia it is found in swamps and around creeks and pools the Mid West, Pilbara and Goldfields-Esperance regions where it grows in sandy-clay soils.

Taxonomy
It was first described in 1810 by Robert Brown as a part of the work Prodromus Florae Novae Hollandiae et Insulae Van Diemen.

See also
List of Cyperus species

References

External links
Cyperus concinnus occurrence data from Australasian Virtual Herbarium

Plants described in 1810
Flora of Western Australia
concinnus
Taxa named by Robert Brown (botanist, born 1773)
Flora of the Northern Territory
Flora of Queensland
Flora of New South Wales
Flora of Victoria (Australia)